Romance Dance is the fifth studio album by American singer-songwriter Kim Carnes. It was released on June 2, 1980 by EMI America. It became Carnes' first charting album, peaking at no. 57 on the Billboard 200. Nine tracks were produced by George Tobin in association with Mike Piccirillo, and one track was produced by Daniel Moore who worked with Carnes on her previous album St. Vincent's Court.

The album features hit singles "More Love" and "Cry Like a Baby", which reached no. 10 and no. 44 on the Billboard Hot 100.

Background 
The album was produced by George Tobin in association with Mike Piccirillo. Carnes had originally intended to record "Bette Davis Eyes" for Romance Dance. Ahead of the album's release, Carnes stated that Romance Dance would be more upbeat than her previous albums, with less of a country influence.

Release and promotion 
Romance Dance was released on June 2, 1980 by EMI America. Promotion began with Carnes embarking on a tour of American radio stations before joining James Taylor as the support act for a North American concert tour in August 1980. In a review of their concert at the Nashville Municipal Auditorium, Billboard noted Carnes' "mesmirizing sandpaper vocals" and described her as an "unforgettable performer".

Carnes made a cameo appearance on episode 24 of the fourth season of Sha Na Na to perform "More Love".

Critical reception 

Writing for The StarPhoenix, Don Perkins commended the album and compared Carnes' vocals to Maggie Bell and Melissa Manchester. In the Los Angeles Times, Robert Hilburn described Romance Dance as "one of the best mainstream pop albums" since Carole Bayer Sager's 1977 self-titled debut album.

Track listing 
 "Swept Me Off My Feet (The Part of the Fool)" (Kim Carnes) – 3:21
 "Cry Like a Baby" (Dan Penn, Spooner Oldham) – 3:05
 "Will You Remember Me" (Carnes) – 4:42
 "Tear Me Apart" (Nicky Chinn, Mike Chapman) – 3:31 (Originally performed by Suzi Quatro in 1976.)
 "Changin'" (Carnes, Dave Ellingson) – 3:54
 "More Love" (William Robinson) – 3:38
 "In the Chill of the Night" (Carnes, Ellingson) – 4:22
 "Where Is Your Heart" (Carnes, Ellingson) – 3:45
 "And Still Be Loving You" (Carnes, Ellingson) – 3:42

Personnel 
 Kim Carnes – lead vocals, backing vocals (1, 2, 3, 7, 8), acoustic piano (5)
 Bill Cuomo – keyboards (1, 2, 3, 6-9), organ (1, 7), ARP String Ensemble (6, 9), string arrangements (9)
 Mike Thompson – keyboards (4)
 Mike Piccirillo – guitars (1, 2, 4, 6), mandolin (1), arrangements (2, 4, 6), backing vocals (2, 4, 8), electric guitar (3, 7), percussion (4), acoustic guitar (7)
 Steve Geyer – acoustic guitar (3), electric guitar (7)
 John Beland – mandolin (5), dobro (5)
 Eric Nelson – bass (1, 3, 4, 7)
 Scott Edwards – bass (2, 6, 8, 9)
 David Hungate – bass (5)
 Craig Krampf – drums (1, 2, 3, 6-9)
 Joel Peskin – saxophone
 Raphael Ravenscroft – saxophone (6)
 Jim Ed Norman – string arrangements (5)
 Julia Waters Tillman – backing vocals (1, 3, 7)
 Maxine Waters Willard – backing vocals (1, 3, 7)
 Patrick Bolen – backing vocals (2, 4)
 Dave Ellingson – backing vocals (2, 8)
 Herb Peterson – backing vocals (5)
 Kin Vassy – backing vocals (5)
 Darlene Love – backing vocals (6)
 Edna Wright – backing vocals (6)

Production 
 Mike Piccirillo – producer (1-4, 6-9), engineer (1-4, 6-9)
 George Tobin – producer (1-4, 6-9)
 Daniel Moore – producer (5)
 Ryan Ulyate – engineer (1-4, 6-9)
 Howard Wolen – engineer (1-4, 6-9)
 Mark Wolfson – engineer (1-4, 6-9)
 Larry Hirsch – engineer (5)
 Ron Evans – second engineer (1-4, 6-9)
 Val Garay – mixing
 Niko Bolas – mix assistant 
 Mike Reese – mastering
 Doug Sax – mastering
 The Mastering Lab (Hollywood, California) – mastering location 
 Gary Goetzman – production manager for George Tobin Productions
 Lisa Marie – session coordinator
 Bill Burks – art direction, design
 Norman Seeff – photography
 Stan Evenson – lettering
 Michael Brokaw – manager (Kragen and Company)
 Ken Kragen – manager (Kragen and Company)

Studios
 Recorded at Studio Sound Recorders (North Hollywood, California).
 Mixed at Record One (Los Angeles, California).
 Mastered at The Mastering Lab (Hollywood, California).

Charts

References 

1980 albums
EMI Records albums
Kim Carnes albums